Morey v. Doud, 354 U.S. 457 (1957), was a case where Doud and two partners sold 'Bondified' brand money orders in Illinois, directly or through agents such as drug and grocery stores. A state law required any seller or issuer of money orders to secure a license and submit to state regulation, except that the statute, by name, explicitly exempted the American Express Company from these requirements. 

Doud, his partners and one of his agents, fearing prosecution under the law, sued the state, arguing the law was unconstitutional. The Supreme Court agreed, finding the special exemption only for American Express violated the Equal Protection Clause of the Fourteenth Amendment.

Overruled by City of New Orleans v. Dukes (1976)

See also 
 List of United States Supreme Court cases, volume 354

References

External links
 

1957 in United States case law
United States Supreme Court cases
United States Supreme Court cases of the Warren Court
American Express